Maurice Limat (September 23, 1914 - January 23, 2002) was a French author of science fiction. 
His œuvre, particularly abundant, was published primarily by publisher Fleuve Noir. He used a variety of pseudonyms, notably Maurice Lionel, Maurice d'Escrignelles, and Lionel Rex.

Overview

Maurice Limat published science fiction novels such as Les Fiancés de la Planète Mars [The Fiancés of Planet Mars] (1936) and Les Naufragés de la Voie Lactée [The Castaways of the Milky Way] (1939), with a style that was reminiscent of the type of science fiction published before or just after World War I.

During that period, the prolific Limat also authored a number of adventure novels with fantasy elements such as La Montagne aux Vampires [The Mountain of Vampires] (1936), about a man who could control vampires, L'Araignée d'Argent [The Silver Spider] (1936), featuring a robotic spider created by an Ancient civilization, Le Septième Cerveau [The Seventh Brain] (1939), Le Zodiaque de l'Himalaya [The Zodiac Of The Himalaya] (1942) and La Comète Écarlate [The Scarlet Comet] (1948), to name but a few.

During the 1950s, Limat wrote more science fiction novels, such as Les Faiseurs de Planètes [The Planet Makers] (1951), Comète 73 [Comet 73] (1953), Courrier Interplanétaire [Interplanetary Courrier] (1953) and Le Mal des Étoiles [Star Sickness] (1954), disguising his abundant production with various pseudonyms.

During 1955, he contributed SOS Galaxie [SOS Galaxy] to the imprint Série 2000 and then wrote Monsieur Cosmos (1956) which dealt with the theme of the macrocosmic man, creator of universes.  His novels began to display the influence of American "space operas".

By the time he began writing for the Anticipation imprint of Editions Fleuve Noir, during 1959, Limat was already a veteran writer.
Les Enfants du Chaos [The Children Of Chaos] (1959), in which men use psychic powers to create a world, but then ask themselves whether they have earned the right to play God, is somewhat characteristic of his subsequent production.

Limat continued to be a prolific writer, authoring numerous, lyrical, sometimes even religious, space operas for Fleuve Noir—107 in total, until Atoxa-des-Abysses [Atoxa-Of-The-Abyss] (1987)—as well as some horror novels for Fleuve Noir's Angoisse imprint, which featured as main character a detective of the supernatural, Teddy Verano.

Limat introduced the character of futuristic police commissioner Robin Muscat in Les Foudroyants [The Lightning Men] (No. 164; 1960), in which a hapless young man is turned into an electromagnetic force.  His most popular, long-running hero was the green-eyed, telepathic Chevalier Coqdor introduced in L'Étoile de Satan [The Star Of Satan] (No. 241; 1964). Muscat and Coqdor often teamed with each other and were featured, separately or together, in a great number of subsequent novels. The Chevalier Coqdor adventures usually celebrated the power of love and tolerance, and a genuine belief in God, the Great Architect of the Universe, something unusual in science fiction.

New stories featuring Chevalier Coqdor are now written by Jean-Michel Archaimbault & Jean-Marc Lofficier. 

1914 births
2002 deaths
French science fiction writers
20th-century French novelists
French male novelists
20th-century French male writers